Rob Walker may refer to:

 Rob Walker (journalist) (born 1968), American journalist and author
 Rob Walker (New York politician) (born 1974/1975), former State Assemblyman for New York and Current Chief Deputy County Executive of Nassau County, NY
 Rob Walker (motorsport) (1917–2002), motor racing team principal and journalist
 Rob Walker (born 1979), Creative Content Officer for Channel Awesome
 Rob Walker (poet) (born 1953), Australian poet
 Rob Walker (sports announcer) (born 1975), master of ceremonies for snooker tournaments

See also
Robert Walker (disambiguation)
Robin Walker (disambiguation)